Izatha acmonias is a moth of the family Oecophoridae. It is endemic to New Zealand, where it is known from the western South Island.

The wingspan is 21–28.5 mm  for males and 23–35 mm for females. Adults have been recorded in November, December and January.

The larvae probably feed on dead Hoheria lyallii.

References

Oecophorinae